Mordellistena picipennis is a species of beetle in the genus Mordellistena of the family Mordellidae. It was described by Smith in 1882.

References

Beetles described in 1882
picipennis